Pedro Alexandre da Silva da Costa (born 18 December 1978), also known as Costinha, is a Portuguese professional futsal coach. A former player, he played as a universal.

Career
Born in São Sebastião da Pedreira, Costa started playing futsal at UP da Venda Nova, progressing to GCD Del Negro in the year before joining Sporting youth ranks, in 1994. In 1995–96, at age 18, he started playing in the first team, staying there for six seasons, winning two league titles and arriving at the national team.

He then had a one-year stint at Freixieiro, helping the club conquer their only league title, before joining Benfica in July 2002. In the eight years he spent with them, with exception of a one-year break to play for Playas de Castellón, he won five league titles, four Portuguese cups, plus captained them in their historic UEFA Futsal Cup win in 2009–10, winning a total of 15 titles.

On 6 July 2011, Costa moved to Japan to compete for Nagoya Oceans, winning numerous titles, including two AFC Futsal Club. He announced his retirement in 2016, subsequently assuming the managerial role of Nagoya Oceans.

Honours

Player
Sporting CP
 Liga Portuguesa (2): 1998–99, 2000–01
 Supertaça de Portugal (1): 2001

Freixieiro
 Liga Portuguesa (1): 2001–02
 Supertaça de Portugal (1): 2002

Benfica
 UEFA Futsal Cup (1): 2009–10
 Liga Portuguesa (5): 2002–03, 2004–05, 2006–07, 2007–08, 2008–09
 Taça de Portugal (4): 2002–03, 2004–05, 2006–07, 2008–09
 Supertaça de Portugal (4): 2003, 2006, 2007, 2009

Nagoya Oceans
 AFC Futsal Club Championship (2): 2011, 2014
 F. League (6): 2010–11, 2011–12, 2012–13, 2013–14, 2014–15, 2015–16
 Ocean Arena Cup (4): 2011, 2012, 2013, 2014
 Japan Futsal Championship (3): 2011, 2014, 2015

Manager
Nagoya Oceans
 AFC Futsal Club Championship (1): 2016
 F.League (2): 2017–18, 2018-19
 F.League Ocean Cup (3): 2017, 2018, 2019
 Japan Futsal Championship (2): 2018, 2019

References

External links
 

1978 births
Living people
Sportspeople from Lisbon
Portuguese men's futsal players
Sporting CP futsal players
AR Freixieiro players
S.L. Benfica futsal players
Playas de Castellón FS players
Nagoya Oceans players
Portuguese expatriate sportspeople in Japan